Rajawali Place is a mixed development complex under construction in Setiabudi, Jakarta, Indonesia. The complex has two skyscrapers: The St. Regis Jakarta Hotel and Rajawali Place office tower. The complex has a land area of 2.3 hectares. The site was formerly occupied by the Four Seasons Jakarta, which relocated to Capital Place Jakarta. The West Setia Budi Reservoir is located in front of the complex.

The tallest skyscraper of the complex has 65 floors above ground and is 244 meters high. It houses St. Regis Jakarta Hotel & Residence. The office tower is 135 meters tall and has 30 floors above ground.

See also

List of tallest buildings in Indonesia
List of tallest buildings in Jakarta

External links
The St. Regis Jakarta
The St. Regis Jakarta

References 

Towers in Indonesia
Buildings and structures in Jakarta
Skyscrapers in Indonesia
Post-independence architecture of Indonesia
Skyscraper office buildings in Indonesia
Skyscraper hotels